Benally is a surname derived from the Navajo word  meaning "his grandchild". Notable people with the surname include:

Klee Benally (born 1975), Navajo musician
Jennifer D. Benally, American politician
Wenona Benally, American politician
Jeneda Benally (born 1980), Navajo musician

Native American surnames
Navajo language